
 is a stratovolcano on the Shiretoko Peninsula in Hokkaidō, Japan. It sits on the border between the towns of Shari and Rausu. Mount Rausu is the northeasternmost Holocene volcano on Hokkaidō. It is one of the 100 famous mountains in Japan.

Mount Rausu's opening festival is held annually on July 3. This day officially opens the climbing season.

In the past 2200 years it is believed that Mount Rausu erupted thrice, with a Plinian Eruption roughly 1400 years ago and a pyroclastic flow about 500 years ago.

History 
 June 1, 1964 - The region around Mount Rausu declared Shiretoko National Park
 July 2005 -  Shiretoko registered as a Natural World Heritage Site

Gallery

See also 

 World Heritage Site
 Shiretoko National Park
 List of mountains in Japan
 100 Famous Japanese Mountains

References

External links 
 Rausudake - Japan Meteorological Agency 
  - Japan Meteorological Agency
 Rausu-Shiretoko Io Volcano Group - Geological Survey of Japan

Stratovolcanoes of Japan
Volcanoes of Hokkaido
Mountains of Hokkaido
Highest points of Japanese national parks
Holocene stratovolcanoes